Aplasia cutis congenita-intestinal lymphangiectasia syndrome is a very rare genetic disorder which is characterized by aplasia cutis congenita, intestinal lymphangiectasia-induced generalized edema, hypoproteinemia, and lymphopenia. It has been described in two Ashkenazi Jewish brothers.

References 

Rare genetic syndromes
Syndromes affecting the skin